The 1939 Cleveland Rams season was the team's third year with the National Football League and the fourth season in Cleveland.

Schedule

Standings

References
1939 Cleveland Rams Season at Pro-Football Reference

Cleveland Rams
Cleveland Rams seasons
Cleveland Rams